Lun Lun is a female giant panda at Zoo Atlanta in Atlanta, Georgia.  The panda, now , was born at the Chengdu Research Base of Giant Panda Breeding in China on August 25, 1997.  Her original name, Hua Hua, was changed to Lun Lun by her sponsor, the Taiwanese rock star Su Huilun. 

As of summer 2022, Lun Lun has given birth to Mei Lan (male 2006), Xi Lan (male 2008), Po (female 2010), twins Mei Lun & Mei Huan (female 2013) and twins Ya Lun & Xi Lun (female 2016).

Births

Mei Lan in 2006 
On September 6, 2006, at 4:51 PM EDT, Lun Lun and mate Yang Yang became the parents of a female cub, named Mei Lan, who made his debut in early 2007. After Mei Lan had been returned to China, officials realized that Mei Lan was actually a male.

It is heavily rumored by Chinese panda bloggers and super fans that Mei Lan is the father of numerous cubs, including some of the most famous in China: JiXiao (female 2019), twins ChengFeng & ChengLang (female 2019), twins HeHua & HeYe (female, male 2020) and Beijing Zoo celebrity Meng Lan (male 2015). Meng Lan gained even more popularity when he briefly escaped his yard at the Beijing Zoo in 2021.

On August 30, 2008 at 10:10pm (22:10) EDT she gave birth to a second cub, a male, named Xi Lan. 

On November 3, 2010, at 5:39 a.m. EDT, Lun Lun gave birth to her third cub, Po, believed to be a male.

Mei Lun and Mei Huan in 2013 
On July 15, 2013, Lun Lun gave birth to her first set of twins, Mei Lun and Mei Huan, both initially identified as male. In December, preliminary exams on Xi Lan and Po as they prepared to return to Chengdu indicated that Po might have been missexed, and the zoo ran DNA tests on several of the bears. On December 13, 2013, Zoo Atlanta reported that Po, Mei Lun, and Mei Huan are all female.

Xi Lun and Ya Lun in 2016 
Lun Lun gave birth to her second set of twins on September 3, 2016 in Atlanta Zoo. They have been named Xi Lun and Ya Lun.

References

External links
Zoo Atlanta

Individual giant pandas
1997 animal births